Henry Addison (January 24, 1798 – January 3, 1870) was Mayor of Georgetown from 1845 to 1857, 1859 to January 1861 and from 1861 to 1867.

Early life
Henry Addison was born on January 24, 1798. He was from Maryland and came to Georgetown, Washington, D.C. at a young age.

Career
Addison was a hardware merchant. He owned a dry goods business on the corner of Bridge and High Streets in Washington, D.C.

Addison served as Mayor of Georgetown from March 3, 1845 to March 2, 1857 and from March 4, 1861 to March 4, 1867. However, he served an additional incomplete term. The results of the election on February 28, 1859 were debated. The judges of the election found Richard R. Crawford had won, but the council after counting the votes found Addison had won. Addison was sworn in on March 9, 1959 and served until January 21, 1861. Crawford won the case R. R. Crawford vs. Henry Addison and served out the remainder of the two year term, from January 21, 1861 to March 3, 1861.

In May and June 1853, legislation passed in Maryland and Georgetown to make a Metropolitan Railroad connecting the Baltimore and Ohio Railroad near Point of Rocks, Maryland to Georgetown. In June 1856, Addison vetoed a second installment of payments for the railroad, which effectively cancelled the project. During his time as mayor, Addison called for a discussion on retrocession, but opinion was divided.

In 1867, Addison ran for mayor against Charles D. Welch, a Republican candidate. A Harper's Weekly cartoon by Thomas Nast depicted the Democratic ticket as the "White Man's ticket".

Personal life
Addison married and had six children.

Addison died on January 3, 1870, at his home on the corner of Dunbarton and Montgomery Street. He was buried at Oak Hill Cemetery in Washington, D.C.

Legacy
Hyde-Addison Elementary School in Washington, D.C. was named after Addison and Anthony T. Hyde. In 2020, the DC Facilities and Commemorative Expressions Working Group committee recommended that both Addison and Hyde should have their names removed from the building. A news article noted that Addison was a slaveholder, according to U.S. Census records.

References

External links

1798 births
1870 deaths
People from Maryland
Mayors of Washington, D.C.
19th-century American merchants
American slave owners
Burials at Oak Hill Cemetery (Washington, D.C.)